This article summarizes the events, album releases, and album release dates in hip hop music for the year 2006.

Released albums

Highest-charting singles

Highest first week sales

As of December 31, 2010.

Highest critically reviewed albums (Metacritic)

See also
Previous article: 2005 in hip hop music
Next article: 2007 in hip hop music

References

2000s in hip hop music
Hip hop
Hip hop music by year